The World's Great Snare is a 1916 American silent drama film produced by Adolph Zukor's Famous Players Film Company and distributed through Paramount Pictures. The film is based on a 1900 novel of the same name by E. Phillips Oppenheim and was directed by Joseph Kaufman. The film stars Pauline Frederick, a noted stage actress, and Irving Cummings, later a director, is the male lead. The film is now considered lost.

Cast

Pauline Frederick as Myra
Irving Cummings as Byran
Ferdinand Tidmarsh as Huntley
Frank Evans as Pete
Riley Hatch as Almes Rutten
Buckley Starkey as Skein

See also
List of lost films

References

External links

Surviving stills from the film

1916 films
1916 drama films
Silent American drama films
American silent feature films
American black-and-white films
Films based on British novels
Paramount Pictures films
Lost American films
Films directed by Joseph Kaufman
1916 lost films
Lost drama films
1910s American films